Mount Wuteve is a mountain located in Liberia, whose summit is the highest point in Liberia. It is located in the Guinea Highlands range, whose parent range is the West Africa Mountains. Data from the Shuttle Radar Topography Mission reveals that the correct elevation of its summit is 1,440 meters, and not the previously quoted 1,380 meters. It is also known as Mount Wologizi among locals of the Loma tribe.

References

 West Africa Mountains
 Guinea Highlands
 Mount Wuteve 
Wuteve
Lofa County
Highest points of countries